Nagri Bala Union Council of Abbottabad District in Khyber-Pakhtunkhwa province of Pakistan. According to the 2017 Census of Pakistan, the population is 17,235.

Subdivisions
VC Akhroota
VC Nagri Bala 1
VC Nagri Bala 2
VC Tatreela

References

Union councils of Abbottabad District